Van Full of Pakistans is the debut studio album by American hip hop group Y'all So Stupid. It was released on May 25, 1993 via Rowdy Records. Recording sessions took place at DARP Studios, Doppler Studios and Bosstown Recording Studios in Atlanta. Production was handled mostly by member Spearhead X, who plays the narrating prank caller on every skit, Da King & I, Sylvan Sargeant, co-producers The Soul Merchants, with Dallas Austin serving as executive producer.

The album's title track peaked at #23 on the Bubbling Under R&B/Hip-Hop Songs chart. Chris Applebaum directed the music video for Little Caesar Productions.

Background and reception
The group was formed in 1991 when rapper H2O moved from Brooklyn to Atlanta, where he met members Unkle Buk, Sha Boogie, Spearhead X, and Logic. They were signed to Rowdy Records in late 1992. Roni Sarig, in Third Coast: Outkast, Timbaland, and How Hip-hop Became a Southern Thing, called the album "a less political, more fun-loving take on the upwardly mobile alt-rap being created by Arrested Development."

The title track was ranked #96 on Complex's list of "The 100 Best Hip-Hop One Hit Wonders," in 2012. LA Weekly included the album on its list of "The 5 Best Summer Rap Albums You've Probably Never Heard." Fact, in its article on the most overlooked hip hop albums of the 1990s, wrote: "This is a rap album that was widely rediscovered in the early 2000s and began changing hands for impressive sums, perhaps because it’s a perfect teleportation device to a period when the music was about having fun and experimenting."

Track listing

Sample credits
Track 1 contains samples from "Hard Times" written by Curtis Mayfield and "Swahili" performed by Clark Terry.
Track 2 contains samples from "I Can Hear You Calling" written by Pentti Glan, Roy Kenner, Hugh Sullivan & Domenic Troiano, "All For One" written by Lorenzo DeChalus, Derek Murphy & Maxwell Dixon, "Scenario" written by James P. Jackson, Trevor Smith, Bryan Higgins, Jonathan Davis, Ali Shaheed Muhammad, Malik Taylor, Sheldon Scott & Troy Anthony Hall, and "Scratch" written by Ike Turner.
Track 4 contains samples from "Mosadi" written by Wayne Henderson and performed by The Crusaders.
Track 6 contains samples from "Azule Serape" written by Victor Feldman and "Punks Jump Up to Get Beat Down" written by Brand Nubian.
Track 8 contains samples from "Tables Turned" written by Guy Draper and performed by The Unifics.
Track 10 contains samples from "Fairchild" written by Allen Toussaint and performed by Willie West.
Track 12 contains samples from "The Thing" written by Joe Sample.
Track 13 contains samples from "Textures" written by Herbie Hancock.
Track 15 contains samples from "Far Away Lands" written by Jimmy Heath.
Track 17 contains samples from "Jumping The Blues" written by Jimmy McGriff.
Track 19 contains samples from "High Noon" written by Dimitri Tiomkin & Ned Washington and "Synthetic Substitution" written by Herb Rooney.

Personnel

Shawne "H2o" Bailey – vocals, sleeve notes
Logic – vocals, sleeve notes
Unkle Buk – vocals, sleeve notes
Sha Boogie – vocals
Xavier "Spearhead X" Hargrove – producer, mixing
Roderick "DJ Majesty" Wiggins – producer, mixing
Sylvan Sargeant – producer
The Soul Merchants – co-producer
Tomi Martin – guitar (track 4)
Amy Lee Schwartzberg – saxophone (track 12)
Debra Killings – bass (tracks: 13, 19, 21)
Darin Prindle – recording, mixing
Thom Kidd – recording
Ted Sabety – mixing
Brett Richardson – engineering assistant
Jason Shablik – engineering assistant
Paul Rankin – engineering assistant
Phil Tan – engineering assistant
Tom Coyne – mastering
Dallas Austin – executive producer
Kim Lumpkin – coordinator
Claude Austin – A&R direction
Glen E. Friedman – art direction, photography

References

External links

1993 debut albums
Rowdy Records albums
Hip hop albums by American artists